Jeff Keeping (born July 19, 1982) is a former professional offensive lineman/centre of the Canadian Football League (CFL) and is currently serving as the Canadian Football League Players' Association's President. Jeff was elected President of the CFLPA in 2016. He was drafted by the Argonauts in the second round of the 2005 CFL Draft. He played CIS football for the Western Ontario Mustangs. He also sits on the EMPWR Foundation board, aiding in concussion awareness and understanding. Jeff is also currently pursuing a career in Firefighting.

Professional career

First stint with Argonauts
Keeping made his CFL debut with the Toronto Argonauts in 2005 where he played offensive lineman, defensive tackle, tight end and fullback.

Montreal Alouettes
On February 16, 2008, Keeping signed with the Montreal Alouettes. On December 11, 2008, Keeping was released, having never played a single game for the Alouettes due to a knee injury sustained during training camp.

Second stint with Argonauts
Keeping re-signed with the Toronto Argonauts on March 20, 2009. He would win a Grey Cup title with the Argonauts in 2012.

Winnipeg Blue Bombers
On February 9, 2016, Keeping signed with the Winnipeg Blue Bombers as a free agent. He suffered a knee injury in the first preseason game that year, and did not suit up for a regular season game.

References

External links
Toronto Argonauts bio 
 

1982 births
Living people
People from Uxbridge, Ontario
Players of Canadian football from Ontario
Canadian football offensive linemen
Canadian football defensive linemen
Canadian football fullbacks
Toronto Argonauts players
Montreal Alouettes players
Winnipeg Blue Bombers players